Pathfinder (original title in Sami: Ofelaš and in Norwegian: Veiviseren) is a 1987 Norwegian action-adventure film written and directed by Nils Gaup. The film is based on an old Sami legend.

It was the first full-length film in Sami, and it was nominated for the Academy Award for Best Foreign Language Film in 1988. The leading role was played by Mikkel Gaup as Aigin. Nils-Aslak Valkeapää played one of the parts as well as writing the music to the film, together with Kjetil Bjerkestrand and Marius Müller.

Name 
The film is called "Ofelaš", which means "Guide" in the Saami language, whereas it is called "Veiviseren" in Norwegian, which roughly translates to "pathfinder," which is also the English title.

Plot 
In Finnmark around AD 1000, a young Sami named Aigin comes home from hunting to find his family massacred by the Tchudes or Chudes. He flees to a place where he can find friends and relatives, and is chased by the Chudes. He is wounded but makes his way to a community of other Samis who live some distance away. Upon reaching the others, Aigin's wound is treated by the shaman of the group. He gets into a debate with them about how to face the Chude attackers: some argue for meeting them in battle, while others maintain they should all run away toward the coast. Aigin and some of the other hunters remain to meet the Chudes, while the remainder of the group flee. The hunters, except Aigin, who hides, are quickly killed by the numerically superior Chudes, but one of the men, the old shaman-leader (noaidi or Pathfinder) Raste is kept alive and tortured. To prevent the torture Aigin reveals himself and offers to act as a pathfinder for the Chudes to the coastal settlement where a large number of Samis live. The old Pathfinder Raste is nevertheless killed by the Chudes.

But Aigin has a plan in mind. He cannot overpower the Chudes, but he can trick them. Leading the Chudes across mountainous terrain, Aigin lures the Chudes into a steep area where they are all forced to tie themselves together with ropes for security. Aigin unties himself and flees, leading the Chudes over a cliff where several of them fall to their deaths when the leaders cut the ropes to save themselves. An avalanche takes most of the Chudes, and the few surviving men give up the pursuit, ensuring Aigin has effectively saved his people. He shows a drum, a symbol of noaidi, given him by Raste, and becomes the new Pathfinder (shaman-leader) of the Sami group by virtue of his wisdom and bravery.

Cast  
 Mikkel Gaup as Aigin 
  as Sahve
 Nils Utsi as Raste
 Anna Maria Blind as Varia
 Ingvald Guttorm as Aigin's Father
 Ellen Anne Bulj as Aigin's Mother
 Inger Utsi as Aigin's Sister
 Henrik H. Buljo as Dorakas
 Nils-Aslak Valkeapää as Siida-Isit
 Helgi Skúlason as Tchude with scar
 Svein Scharffenberg as Tchude chief
 Knut Walle as Tchude Interpreter
 John Sigurd Kristensen as Tchude Strongman
 Svein Birger Olsen as Diemis
 Sverre Porsanger as Sierge
 Amund Johnskareng as Heina
 Ailo Gaup as Orbes

Production 
The film was written and directed by Nils Gaup, who based the story on a Sami legend with variants in a number of Scandinavian folklores. Gaup said he heard the story from his grandfather, who was in turn told the story by a traditional storyteller. Gaup wove the story around the core of the legend, and introduced details such as shamanic initiation rite and a romantic element with the character Sahve. The film was set in the pre-Christian era in the region depicting the worldview of the Sami people.

The film was shot in Kautokeino, Finnmarksvidda during the winter of 1987, where temperatures were as low as –47 °C. This presented unique difficulties with the cast, crew, and camera equipment in the harsh cold. Most of the cast were Sami, and were used to the cold, but the stuntmen hired from outside the region refused to work under such conditions and were replaced by a team who had worked in the Bond film A View to a Kill.  There was also sabotage of the equipment by local people suspicious of outsiders.

The original title was Ofelaš, which is a Sami word that translates to "pathfinder". The film is in the Sámi language, and a Tchude language created by Esben Kr. Amot. The director however chose not to subtitle the Tchude language. The film is considered the first Sami feature-length film. The film went over budget by 2.5 million, costing eventually 17 million krone, and became what was then Norway's most expensive film. The film is a co-production of Filmkameratene A/S, the Norway Film Development Co. A/S and Norsk Film A/S. It was produced by John M. Jacobsen.  It was distributed worldwide by International Film Exchange/Carolco Film International.  The film was first released on 3 November 1987 in Norway, and released in the United States on 7 April 1989.

Reception

Initial critical reception for the film was lukewarm, but it was popular in the box office in Norway, where 700,000 attended screenings of the film. The film was nominated for Best Foreign Language Film at the 1988 Oscars, but lost to Babette's Feast. It won the Amanda Best Film award in 1988. The film is now often considered one of the best films of Norwegian cinema.

The film is seen as part of the Sami revitalisation movement that celebrates the survival of the Sami language, culture and tradition that resisted their assimilation into the wider Norwegian culture.

Remake

An American remake also titled Pathfinder was released in 2007. This remake is only loosely based on the 1987 film.  A graphic novel of the remake was also produced.

Awards and nominations

See also 
 List of historical drama films
 List of submissions to the 60th Academy Awards for Best Foreign Language Film
 List of Norwegian submissions for the Academy Award for Best Foreign Language Film

References

External links 
 
 
 

1987 films
1980s adventure films
Norwegian adventure films
Sámi-language films
Films based on Finno-Ugric mythology
Films directed by Nils Gaup
Films set in Norway
Films set in the 11th century
Sámi in Norway
Indigenous films
Carolco Pictures films
1987 directorial debut films
Avalanches in film